Mihail Marin (born 21 April 1965) is a Romanian chess player and writer. He was awarded the title of Grandmaster by FIDE. Marin's first major success in international chess was in qualifying for the Interzonal in 1987. He has won three Romanian Championships and has played in the Chess Olympiads ten times, winning a bronze individual medal in 1988. For several years he was editor of the magazine Chess Extrapress.

Marin has written a number of well-received books: Secrets of Chess Defence (Gambit Publications, 2003), Learn from the Legends: Chess Champions at Their Best (Quality Chess, 2004), Secrets of Attacking Chess (Gambit Publications, 2005), Beating the Open Games (Quality Chess, 2007), A Spanish Opening Repertoire for Black (Quality Chess, 2007) and Reggio Emilia 2007/2008 (together with Yuri Garrett - Quality Chess, 2009). Learn from the Legends was named the 2005 ChessCafe Book of the Year, and was nominated for the 2004 BCF Book of the Year. Secrets of Chess Defence was nominated for the 2003 ChessCafe Book of the Year. International Master Jeremy Silman, himself a prize-winning author of chess books, has called Marin "one of the world's finest chess writers" and wrote of Learn from the Legends, "I can't recall having seen a better book in the last two decades".

References

External links 

Interview with Mihail Marin

1965 births
Living people
Chess players from Bucharest
Romanian chess players
Chess grandmasters
Chess Olympiad competitors
Chess writers